Yellow Spring is an unincorporated community in Hampshire County in the U.S. state of West Virginia. According to the 2000 census, the Yellow Spring community has a population of 296. Yellow Spring is named after the "Yellow Spring" located there on the Cacapon River. The community lies at the junction of West Virginia Route 259 and Cacapon River Road (West Virginia Secondary Route 14). Yellow Spring is sometimes incorrectly listed or referred to as Yellowspring or Yellow Springs.

Historic sites 
 Asa Cline House, WV Route 259
 Yellow Spring Mill (c. 1896–1898), WV Route 259

References

External links 

Unincorporated communities in Hampshire County, West Virginia
Unincorporated communities in West Virginia